The National Youth Conference (Arabic: المؤتمر الوطني للشباب) is a forum for direct dialogue between the Egyptian youth and representatives of the Egyptian government under the participation of President of Egypt Abdel Fattah El-Sisi.

Background 
This conference came after the call of Abdel Fattah El-Sisi President of Egypt for holding a national conference for youth, which was launched during the celebration of the Egyptian youth day on January 9, 2016.

Slogan 
The slogan of the conference, repeated several times throughout the different versions, is "Innovate. Advance."

Versions

The First Conference (October 2016 - Sharm El Sheikh)

Overview 
The first National Youth Conference was held under the participation of President of Egypt Abdel Fattah El-Sisi, with the participation of more than 3000 young men and women from the Egyptian governorates, The Conference held 487 speakers including 330 young people, 120 working hours including 83 workshops and sessions.

Recommendations 

 The formation of a national committee of youth, under the direct supervision of the Presidency of Egypt, to conduct a comprehensive examination and review of the position of young people imprisoned in connection with cases, and no judicial rulings have been issued against them.
 The presidency of Egypt, in coordination with the Council of Ministers and a group of youth symbols, to prepare a political vision to inaugurate a national center for training and qualifying youth cadres.
 The Presidency of Egypt in coordination with all state agencies towards holding a monthly youth conference attended by an appropriate number of youth representatives from all walks of life and trends, during which the position of all recommendations and decisions issued by the first national youth conference will be reviewed and reviewed.
 The government, in coordination with the concerned authorities in the country, studies proposals and projects to amend the protest law.
 The government prepares to organize a comprehensive community dialogue contract for the development and reform of education within a month at most, attended by all specialists and experts, with a view to setting a national working paper for educational reform outside the traditional tracks.
 Inviting youth from political parties and forces to prepare programs and policies that contribute to spreading the culture of volunteerism through all political means and tools.
 Entrust the government in coordination with the parliament to expedite the issuance of legislation regulating the media and the completion of the formation of bodies and councils organizing journalistic and media work.
 The government, in cooperation with Al-Azhar Al-Shareef, the Egyptian Church, and all concerned parties in the state, to organize a broad community dialogue to consolidate values, principles, and morals, and to lay sound foundations for correcting religious discourse.

The First Regular Conference (December 2016 - Cairo)

Overview 
The first periodical National Youth Conference was held under the participation of President of Egypt Abdel Fattah El-Sisi, in Al-Masa Hotel in Cairo, with the participation of more than 1000 young men and women, The Conference held 29 speakers including 15 young people, 10 working hours including 6 workshops and sessions.

Recommendations 

 Conducting a study on the demonstration law that was approved April 2016.
 President of Egypt Abdel-Fattah El-Sisi mandated the government to submit a request to the House of Representatives to re-discuss the civil associations law in line with the nature of their work.
 The continuation of the work of formed committees to study the cases of youth in custody.
 Supporting volunteer initiatives and community dialogue to examine education and religious dialogue issues.

The Second Regular Conference (January 2017 - Aswan)

Overview 
The second periodical National Youth Conference was held under the participation of President of Egypt Abdel Fattah El-Sisi, in Aswan, with the participation of more than 1300 young men and women, It was attended by more than 23 ministers, a host of deputies, Upper Egypt's governors, university presidents The Conference held 48 speakers including 25 young people, 20 working hours including 11 workshops and sessions.

Recommendations 

 The establishment of the Supreme Commission for the Development of Upper Egypt, which aims at improving public services and providing job opportunities, in addition to preserving Nubian artifacts with an investment of up to LE5 billion in the next five years.
 Complete all development projects in Nasr Nubia and Wadi Karkar, and the allocation of LE320 million to complete these projects before the end of June 2018.
 Launch a national project to establish integrated industrial zones for small and micro industries. The first phase is to establish 200 small factories in each governorate in Upper Egypt in the next six months.
 Continue to expand the scope of social protection measures by developing the solidarity and dignity programs (Takafol wi Karama), that include programs for children of the families covered in the programs, through launching labour-intensive projects.
 Increase efforts directed at improving the quality of life in Upper Egypt, by continuing to intensify efforts in the areas of health, education, transportation and housing.
 Accelerate the implementation of the Golden Triangle project – Qena, Safaga and Qusseir – in five consecutive stages, to establish areas for the mining industry and global tourism, so that the triangle becomes an international attraction area for investment.
 Transform Aswan into the capital of African economy and culture and to celebrate the 200th anniversary of the discovery of Abu Simbel Temple to promote tourism in Egypt and organize a major celebration for this anniversary.
 Exclude the area of Khor Qandi estimated at 12,000 feddans, offered by the Reef El-Masry company, to set an integrated vision of the area within a maximum of three months.
 Review the position of those who have not been compensated in the period before and after the establishment of the High Dam by a national committee formed by the relevant parties. The committee will complete its work within six months at the most.

The Third Regular Conference (April 2017 - Ismailia)

Overview 
The third periodical National Youth Conference was held under the participation of President of Egypt Abdel Fattah El-Sisi, in Ismailia in Sinai, with the participation of more than 1200 young men and women, The Conference held 34 speakers including 17 young people, 11 working hours including 6 workshops and sessions.

Recommendations 

 Declaring 2018 as the year of the disabled
 Forming internal audit groups from young cadres within state institutions and bodies.
 Launching an initiative to beautify the squares and streets and to facilitate youth projects that currently face difficulties to issue the required licenses.
 Forming a group for motivation and follow-ups from the Administrative Control Authority youth who presented the simulation of the Egyptian economy, in addition to another youth group from the Presidential Leadership Program to follow up on the plans and recommendations and to present the outcomes at ongoing youth conferences.
 Studying the development of the Investment Council and referring it to the Supreme Council for Investment and Export.
 Activating the Supreme Council of Payments for the integration of the informal economy.
 Automating the sovereign system, such as customs and taxes to reduce financial leakage.
 Initiating the procedures for the establishment of the Supreme Council of Database, under the chairmanship of the president of the republic.

The Fourth Regular Conference (July 2017 - Alexandria)

Overview 
The third periodical National Youth Conference was held under the participation of President of Egypt Abdel Fattah El-Sisi, in Alexandria Library in Alexandria, With the participation of 1500 young people from different governorates of the West Delta region, As many as 1,300 youth from Alexandria, Matrouh, Beheira and Kafr el Sheikh Governorates attended the gathering. university youth, and those who applied to attend the conference via the conference website, and the youth of the second batch of the Presidential Program for Youth Leadership Qualification from the governorates of the West Delta region, youth representatives of businessmen associations and secretaries participated in the conference. Youth in political parties, and a group of young people working in NGOs and volunteer work.

Recommendations 

 The full support of the state for the World Youth Forum, which was called upon by the Egyptian youth. Inviting presidents and youth from all over the world to attend the discussion to formulate a message of peace and love from the land of Egypt.
 To instruct the government to establish a mechanism to monitor the implementation of the 2030 Strategy, and to evaluate it periodically, through the use of similar models, which empower youth.
 Intensifying the efforts of the government and the state to develop Alexandria governorate, by increasing urban lands by 18,000 acres and developing the traffic axes in the governorate.
 Completion of the development of slum areas of "Bashaer Al-Kheir" with a total of 7,500 units.
 Commence the development of the archeological city of Rosetta.
 Completion of the projects of the industrial zones in Behira governorate with an area of 10,000 acres and putting them up for investment
 Establishment of an agricultural stock market on an area of 57 acres in Al-Tahrir directorate in Wadi Al-Natroun.
 Start immediately the completion of the operational studies on the development project of western Egypt.
 Introduce immediately available lands in the investment zone, over an area of 10,000 acres, in Metobas, Kafr Al-Sheikh, which would provide many job opportunities for the youth.
 The formation of a committee from the ministries of defence, housing and local development to study the building height limitations in the governorate and finding possible desert alternatives.
 The government is to consider and study immediately all the demands and complaints submitted by the people of the governorates of the West Delta.
 The government should urgently start preparing an integrated plan to establish a comprehensive cultural entity in the New Administrative Capital and the city of New Alamein.
 The Cabinet shall complete the approval of the new administrative division of the governorates in Egypt. This includes the addition of a Sahara Desert to Upper Egypt governorates, extending its borders to the Red Sea and adjusting the borders of the other governorates. This will be a major step in accelerating development efforts and achieving social justice.

The Fifth Regular Conference (May 2018 - Cairo) 
The third periodical National Youth Conference was held under the participation of President of Egypt Abdel Fattah El-Sisi, in ِAl-Masa Hotel in Cairo. The conference discussed the visions and aspirations of Egyptian youth for the next four years and the aspirations of Egyptian youth for political life in Egypt, “Ask the President” session was one of the most important segments of the conference in which the president addressed several important topics that occupied public opinion at the time by answering the people’s questions.

Recommendations 

 Launching the Political Cadre School under the umbrella of the National Training Academy.
 Launching Public Policy National Conference to discuss political issues in the Egyptian arena, and to additionally put a communications strategy between parties and executive bodies to take part in solving society’s problems.
 Amending laws of political parties and regaining national identity of the Egyptians in cooperation with concerned bodies and civil society.
 Preparing a working paper to deal with the file on freedoms and public opinion cases, and establishing the National Youth Council to be in charge of drafting resolutions pertaining to them.
 Emphasising the state’s full support of the World Youth Forum, and mandating the government to utilize youth’s elite to set a follow-up mechanism to execute Egypt’s 2030 Strategy.

References 

Conferences in Cairo
Conferences in Sharm El Sheikh
Youth conferences